Port Charlotte distillery (also known as Rhins distillery and Lochindaal distillery) was a Scotch whisky distillery on the island of Islay, off the west coast of Scotland from 1829 to 1929.

History
Port Charlotte Distillery was a purpose-built distillery, founded in 1829 when it was operated by Colin Campbell. In 1831 McLennan & Grant took over for 1 year. George McLennan continued until 1835 when he was declared bankrupt. It was then operated by Walter Graham around 1837. Later the distillery was owned by Hector Henderson and James Lamont of Henderson, Lamont and Company until 1852 when they went bankrupt. The lease was sold on with 29 years left for £750. It then operated as the Rhins Distillery & company with John McLennan in charge until 1855.

On 18 May 1861 a fire broke out in the kiln at the distillery which resulted in the destruction of the kiln and about 20 bushels of malt. The villagers managed to extinguish the fire before the rest of the distillery was damaged.

In 1864 the Inland Revenue officer, Francis Gill, who was stationed at the distillery was found drowned on 5 September in Laggan Bay.

From 1855 the distillery was operated by John B Sheriff of Glasgow  and from 1895 J.B. Sherrif & Co Ltd until 1921. In 1921 it was acquired by Benmore Distilleries Limited which was taken over in 1929 by the Distillery Company Ltd. This resulted in the closure of the distillery.

However, the buildings have remained intact.

Revival
The brand has been revived, although the distillery as such remained closed. Whisky distilled at nearby Bruichladdich is matured in oak casks at Port Charlotte. Whiskies currently bottled there include:
Port Charlotte Scottish Barley, ABV 50%.
PC 11 Heavily peated, ABV 59.8%.

References

Whisky distilleries in Islay
1829 establishments in Scotland
1929 disestablishments in Scotland
2011 establishments in Scotland
History of Argyll and Bute
British companies disestablished in 1929
British companies established in 2011
British companies established in 1829
Food and drink companies established in 1829
Food and drink companies established in 2011
Food and drink companies disestablished in 1929